is a 2022 Japanese romantic drama film based on the 1989 manga of the same name written and illustrated by Aoi Hiiragi. The film is directed and written by Yūichirō Hirakawa, co-distributed by Sony Pictures Entertainment and Shochiku, and stars Nana Seino and Tori Matsuzaka. The film was released in theaters in Japan on October 14, 2022.

The film takes place ten years after the original manga (as well as the 1995 anime film with the same name), and marks the first live-action film adaptation based on the manga.

Premise
A 24-year-old Shizuku has given up her dreams as a novelist, but works hard at the children's book publishing company as an editor. On the other hand, Seiji still follows his dream abroad, even as the distance between him and Shizuku grows ever more.

Cast
Nana Seino as Shizuku Tsukishima
Runa Yasuhara as young Shizuku
Tori Matsuzaka as Seiji Amasawa
Tsubasa Nakagawa as young Seiji
Rio Uchida as Yūko Harada
Sara Sumitomo as young Yūko
Yuki Yamada as Tatsuya Sugimura
Towa Araki as young Tatsuya

Production
In January 2020, it was announced that a live-action film adaptation based on the Whisper of the Heart manga written and illustrated by Aoi Hiiragi was in the works. Yūichirō Hirakawa directed the film, with Sony Pictures Entertainment and Shochiku co-producing and distributing. Nana Seino and Tori Matsuzaka starred as Shizuku Tsukishima and Seiji Amasawa respectively. The film was inspired by the 1995 anime film adaptation produced by Studio Ghibli. Manga artist Aoi Hiiragi expressed her gratitude and excitement towards the live-action film. In June 2022, Yuki Yamada and Rio Uchida were cast as Tatsuya Sugimura and Yūko Harada respectively, while Towa Araki and Sara Sumitomo were to portray their younger selves.

Anne Watanabe provided the theme song for the film,

Release
The film was first scheduled to release on September 18, 2020, but was delayed to October 14, 2022, due to the COVID-19 pandemic.

Reception

Box office
The film debuted at number 4 out of top 10 in the Japanese box office in its opening weekend.

Critical reception
Mark Schilling from The Japan Times ranked the film 2 out of 5 stars, as he thought the film's target audience felt too domesticated. Alicia Haddick from Crunchyroll gave the film a mixed review, after offering high praise for the original Whisper of the Heart, she goes on to state that "The latest live-action incarnation is made worse by the potential of the story it could have told had they only chosen to follow through on something genuinely evolutionary, rather than nostalgic".

References

External links
 

2020s Japanese films
2022 films
Films postponed due to the COVID-19 pandemic
Japanese romantic drama films
Sony Pictures Entertainment Japan films
Shochiku films
Live-action films based on manga
Films set in Japan